Basketball Club Namur-Capital, also known as Belfius Namur-Capitale for sponsorship reasons, is a Belgian women's basketball club from Namur. It was founded in 2010 from the merge of local teams Saint Servais and Novia. 

St. Servais was the most successful team in the Belgian Championship with sixteen championships between 1991 and 2009. In its first season following the merge BC Namur-Capitale was 4th, qualifying for the 2012 Eurocup.

Current roster

Titles
 Belgian Championship
Winners (16): 1991, 1992, 1993, 1994, 1997, 1998, 1999, 2000, 2001, 2002, 2003, 2004, 2005, 2006, 2007, 2009, 2013
 Belgian Cup
Winners (9): 1992, 1993, 1994, 1998, 1999, 2000, 2002, 2003, 2004, 2005, 2006, 2013, 2016, 2018

Notable former players
   Erin Lawless
 Annemarie Părău

References

Namur
Basketball teams established in 2010
Sport in Namur (city)